Jasën Blu is a Nigerian R&B singer, songwriter, record producer and score composer. His debut release, the Road 2 Soulwave EP was released in October 2020 after several unofficial releases as well as commercial singles which include "Already" (2017), "Brown Shuga" (2019) and "Love Or Nothin" (2020). He has also recorded soundtracks and composed original music and sound designs to a number of Nollywood films, the first of which was Obi Emelonye's Africa Magic television series "The Calabash" in 2014.

Early life 
Blu was born and raised in Akure, Nigeria. His first ever live performance was at age twelve, when he sang a mimed version of "Angel" by Shaggy to fellow students at his boarding house social gathering in secondary school.

Education 
He attended Federal University of Technology Akure from 2004 to 2009, studying Urban & Regional Planning while combining academics with music. After several demo recordings and back up vocal performances for other student artistes, he moved to Lagos in 2008 to further his music career.

Career
Blu's first big break came when his song "L.A.S.G.I.D.I. (Gidi Anthem)" was selected as lead soundtrack and trailer theme to Obi Emelonye's 2012 tragedy thriller, "Last Flight to Abuja", for which he gained considerable recognition due to the success of the film. He then had minor releases like "Song About You" and "The Prelude" while working on his debut album. On Valentine's Day 2017, he released "Already", the lead single off his debut album and shortly after took to social media to announce the title of the album as "Soulwave" while continuing work on new materials. Taking a one-year hiatus from releasing music, Blu returned in April 2019 with a remix of Ezi Emela's song, "Think To Lose You". He then followed up with "Brown Shuga", a remake of D'Angelo's 1995 hit, "Brown Sugar", which was well received by fans in Japan. Blu supported "Brown Shuga" with several live performances around the country, including an appearance at the 2019 edition of Seyi Sodimu's "Grown & Sexy" Concert alongside top domestic and international R&B stars which include Styl-Plus and American R&B singer Joe. As of July 2019, he confirmed his debut album "Soulwave" is completed. Despite the coronavirus outbreak that kept most of the world indoors and quarantined in earlier months of 2020, Blu released "Love Or Nothin'", the second single off the upcoming debut album on the 4th of April.

Record Production & Score Compositions 
Blu founded and operates a music production outfit, SoundQraft LLC, via which he produces all his music by himself and writes, produces and mix musical recordings for other musicians. He has also composed music to a number Nollywood films, including Emelonye's Last Flight to Abuja and Africa Magic original television series, "The Calabash", directed by Emelonye. He has cited his work in film composition as one of the reasons for his delayed music releases.

Discography 
EPs

• Road 2 Soulwave

References 

Nigerian musicians
1987 births
Living people